Isdera AG or Ingenieurbüro für Styling, Design und Racing (English: Engineering Company for Styling, Design and Racing) is a privately run German specialty automaker and design service provider based in Saarwellingen, with a design studio in Munich and a design subsidiary in Shanghai, China. The company was founded and formerly based in Leonberg, Germany. Each high-performance sports car is hand-built by a small team of craftsmen, and the only way to purchase a brand new Isdera was to call the CEO directly. Each vehicle is custom built for its original buyer, and a waiting period of twelve months is to be expected.

History 
Eberhard Schulz in order to seek a job at one of the automotive companies of Germany built his own car in the garage of his home in 1969 called the Erator GTE. He drove the car to Porsche's and Mercedes-Benz's headquarters and was subsequently offered a job at Porsche in the design department in 1970. In 1978, Schultz left Porsche and joined the b&b company where he would go on to design the Mercedes-Benz CW311 concept which was touted as the successor to the Mercedes-Benz 300SL. The concept was built and promoted by b&b and had Mercedes badging after approval from the manufacturer.

Isdera was founded in 1982 in Leonberg, Germany with the intent to put the CW311 into production after a deal with Mercedes-Benz. Its first car, called the Spyder which was an open top sports car based on the CW311, was presented in the same year. The Spyder was powered by a modified Mercedes-Benz Inline-4 engine generating . A new variant having an uprated 3.0-litre Inline-6 engine was introduced in 1987. The Spyder was renamed as the Spyder 033i and the Spyder 036i to indicate the difference between the offered engines and the use of electronic fuel injection in the engines (with the "i" designation).

The CW311 would finally see production in 1984 as the Imperator 108i. The Imperator 108i was offered with a choice of Mercedes-Benz V8 engines having different displacements, ranging from 5.0-litres to 6.0-litres. Some engines were also tuned by AMG. The car received a facelift in 1991 which added changes in ventilation to improve cooling, some visual changes and changes to the exhaust system to pass stringent safety tests. A total of 30 Imperator 108is would be made before production ended in 1993.

In 1993, Isdera designed the Commendatore 112i, which was to be a successor to the Imperator 108i. It had many advanced and unique features at the time such as two sets of gull-wing doors, a velocity-sensitive electronic chassis that lowers the car at high speeds, and an automatic air brake. The car had a mid-mounted Mercedes-Benz 6.0 L V12 engine generating  and a 6-speed manual transmission. The 112i was featured in the 1997 video game Need for Speed II.

Isdera planned a limited production run of the Commendatore 112i like its predecessor and quoted that each car would take six months to complete. The car was not functional when it was introduced. The development of the car reportedly cost a total of €4,000,000. This combined with the ongoing economic recession in South Asia, particularly the bursting of Japan's bubble economy, pushed the company into bankruptcy shortly after the car's introduction as the major investments came from Japan. The company was then bought by Swiss investors under whom Schultz completed the car in order to make it driveable on the road.

In 1999, the Commendatore 112i was updated and renamed to "Silver Arrow C112i" by the new management. On the exterior, the updated car had conventional side-view mirrors and had silver five-spoke Mercedes-Benz alloy wheels instead of the gold BBS units. Interestingly, there was no Isdera badging on the car and it had Mercedes-Benz badging instead. The Silver Arrow C112i was unveiled at the 1999 Frankfurt Motor Show.

The Silver Arrow was bought by a Swiss businessman Albert Klöti at a price of €1,500,000 in 2000. Albert kept the car for 5 years after offering it on eBay for sale in October 2005 for US$3,000,000. The car failed to sell at the auction.

In 2006, Isdera introduced the Autobahnkurier AK116i, a retro-styled vehicle based on the Mercedes-Benz W126 S-Class and powered by two Mercedes-Benz V8 engines – one for each axle – from the W126 series 500 SE. The design which resembled a touring car from the 1930s, was inspired from the Bugatti Royale and the one-off 1936 Mercedes-Benz 540K Autobahn Kurier. The car featured a full leather interior with creature-comforts and a marble dashboard.

In 2016, Isdera bought back the Silver Arrow C112i from Albert Klöti, restored the car back to its original form and name and made appearances at motor shows.

In 2017, Isdera entered into a partnership with a Chinese electric vehicle startup WM Motors to design and produce electric cars. The 2018 Isdera Commendatore GT is the first vehicle developed as a result of this partnership and was unveiled at the Auto China 2018. Like preceding Isdera automobiles, the GT also employs gull-wing doors.

Models 
 1969: Isdera Erator GTE
 1982: Isdera Spyder 036i
 1984: Isdera Imperator 108i
 1993: Isdera Commendatore 112i
 2006: Isdera Autobahnkurier AK116i
 2018: Isdera Commendatore GT

Gallery

See also 
 Lotec

References

External links 

 
 Automobile-catalog.com: All Isdera cars specifications and performance data 
 RitzSite.nl: Company history of Isdera
 1999 Isdera Silver Arrow C112i

1982 establishments in Germany
Vehicle manufacturing companies established in 1982
Car manufacturers of Germany
Companies based in Saarland
Sports car manufacturers
Automobiles with gull-wing doors